A military road is a type of road built by an armed force of a country, which is usually responsible for its access, control, and maintenance.

It is used mostly by soldiers, government officials, and sometimes the public. Most military roads are not accessible by public vehicles. However, some are designated and maintained as state highways. Some military roads are known as government access roadsl since the military is a part of the government. Anyone who is not a government official who drives on such a private road is usually summoned or prosecuted.

Military roads have played a significant role during wars in the 18th century. They linked important cities during wars, as well as vital links for commercial and telegraph use. Swamps and streams were large obstacles during the building of military roads in various locations in the United States.

See also 
List of military roads

References

External links

Types of roads